Nick DiPillo is an American basketball coach and administrator currently serving as Director of Player Personnel for Seton Hall University women's basketball program.

He served as an assistant coach for the New York Liberty of the WNBA from 2004 to the spring of 2009. DiPillo played for two years at Rutgers–Camden before finishing his collegiate career at Fairleigh Dickinson University-Teaneck, New Jersey. He served as assistant coach for the men's basketball team at Kean University in Union Township, Union County, New Jersey prior to joining the Liberty. Kean compiled a 34–19 record during his two-year stint and captured the ECAC Division III Metro Championship in 2003–04.

Among other roles, DiPillo served as post coach for the Liberty.  New York went 18–16 with DiPillo on the bench in 2005 and lost to Indiana in the playoffs. They also reached the playoffs in 2007 and 2008, losing to the Detroit Shock both times.

DiPillo left the Liberty organization just before the 2009 season began. DiPillo from 2009 thru 2013 was a manager and basketball skills instructor at Monroe 33 Tennis and Basketball Center, in Monroe, New Jersey.

References

Year of birth missing (living people)
Living people
American women's basketball coaches
American men's basketball players
Fairleigh Dickinson University alumni
New York Liberty coaches
Rutgers–Camden Scarlet Raptors men's basketball players
Basketball players from New Jersey